EH Bildu, short for Euskal Herria Bildu is a left-wing, Basque nationalist, pro-independence political coalition active in the Spanish autonomous communities of Basque Country, Navarre and Burgos Province.

EHB's predecessor Bildu ("Gather") was launched on 3 April 2011 to participate in the May 2011 local elections It was formed as a reaction to the Supreme Court of Spain's ruling in March 2011 that barred the new left-wing Basque nationalist (Abertzale left) Sortu party from electoral participation. Bildu was an alliance of the centre-left Eusko Alkartasuna, left-wing Alternatiba and independents of the left-wing nationalist spectrum, many of whom former members or supporters of the outlawed Batasuna party.

EHB was launched on 10 June 2012 in San Sebastián by five founding components: Eusko Alkartasuna, Aralar, Alternatiba, Sortu, and independents of the Abertzale left (groups and independent individuals from the Basque leftist-nationalist milieu, many of whom had been members of Batasuna), all of whom had been previously members of the Amaiur coalition. On 3 July 2012 Laura Mintegi was chosen as candidate for Lehendakari in the 2012 Basque parliamentary election. Mintegi, a professor at the University of the Basque Country, formerly stood as a candidate for Herri Batasuna.

History

Formation of Bildu
Bildu was formed as a response to the March 2011 ruling by the Supreme Court of Spain that banned a new Basque party called Sortu from being registered. Bildu was a coalition of the social-democratic Eusko Alkartasuna, Alternatiba (a splinter group of Ezker Batua) and independent individuals from the Basque leftist-nationalist environment, originating from the outlawed Batasuna party. Bildu was banned by the Supreme Court as well, due to their ties to Batasuna, the political wing of the terrorist group ETA. The decision to ban Bildu resulted in street protests in Bilbao and other cities. However, on 5 May 2011, exactly the day the election campaign started off, the Constitutional Court of Spain lifted the ban and Bildu was allowed to take part in elections.

In the 2020 Basque regional election 3 former ETA members were elected: Arkaitz Rodríguez, Iker Casanova e Ikoitz Arrese.

2011 regional and local elections

At the 2011 local elections Bildu received 26% of the vote in the Basque region, coming second only to the Basque Nationalist Party (PNV). The party won seats in most of the councils of the Southern Basque Country, including San Sebastián (where it came up first), Bilbao, Vitoria-Gasteiz and Pamplona.

2011 general election
For the 2011 general election Eusko Alkartasuna, Alternatiba and their allies formed a new alliance, under the name Amaiur, along with Aralar, previously part of Nafarroa Bai, and other abertzale (i.e., Basque nationalist) groups.

2012 Basque Parliament Elections 
In the election for the Basque Parliament that took place on 21 October 2012, EH Bildu the second most seats after the more established EAJ-PNV. The coalition party won 21 out of 75 seats with 25% of the popular vote. No single party won a majority in this election.

2014 European Parliament election 
In the 2014 European Parliament election EH Bildu participated as part of the list The Peoples Decide (LPD), comprising left-wing nationalist and separatist parties from several autonomous regions of Spain. On the first position of that list was EHB member Josu Juaristi who was elected member of the European parliament. He joined the group of the European United Left–Nordic Green Left (GUE/NGL).

Electoral performance

Regional parliaments

Basque Parliament

Parliament of Navarre

Cortes Generales

Nationwide

Regional breakdown

European Parliament

Notes

References

Bibliography

 
2012 establishments in Spain
Articles containing video clips
Basque politics
Nationalist parties in Spain
Political parties established in 2012
Political parties in Navarre
Political parties in Northern Basque Country
Political party alliances in Spain
Regionalist parties in Spain
Socialist parties in the Basque Country (autonomous community)
Organisations based in San Sebastián